Lightyear is a seven-piece British ska punk band formed in Derby, England, in 1997. They were part of a UK music scene that mixed ska punk with other genres including funk, indie-rock and hip-hop. The band signed to Household Name Records in 2001, and released two full-length albums before splitting in 2003. Since 2006 the band have had a number of reunions.

Biography 

The band formed in 1997, with their first gig in their hometown of Derby in 1998. Lightyear released their debut album Call of the Weasel Clan in October 2001. In 2002 they appeared at the Carling Weekend Festivals with Sick of It All and Alkaline Trio. The band are known for their feel good vibes and exuberant mosh-pits.

Lightyear began work on their second album Chris Gentlemens Hairdresser and Railway Bookshop in April 2003 with producer Dave Chang, having already decided to split up after recording the album and touring twice more; once in support of the album, followed by a farewell tour. The album was released in July 2003, accompanied by a tour with Captain Everything! and Jerry-built. They played what was supposed to be their last show on 26 September 2003 at the Assembly Rooms in Derby, supported by Evil Macaroni, Captain Everything! and Adequate Seven.

Post split 
On 9 May 2006, DJ Mike Davies announced on the Radio 1 Lock Up Show that Lightyear would be reforming for a fortnight long tour around the UK, finishing in Derby. Originally dubbed the "Twelve Days of Chaos" tour, it was renamed the "Lightyear ...Would Like to Apologise in Advance" tour as more promoters took interest. Davies invite them to play a set on his Radio 1 Lock Up stage at the Carling Weekend Festivals at Reading and Leeds. The band split up on stage for the second time on 26 August 2006 at the Carling Weekend Festival at Bramham Park, Leeds. Shortly afterwards, Lightyear performed a final 'friends & family only' gig at The Victoria Inn, Derby. Subsequent one-off shows took place in Derby at the Assembly Rooms (November 2007) and The Venue (October 2009).

In March 2012, it was announced across social networking sites that Lightyear were going to reform for a six-show mini-tour, sponsored by Big Cheese magazine. In the same year Banquet Records reissued both albums on vinyl.

They returned again 2015 to play several shows, including the Slam Dunk Festival in Leeds.

In May 2017, Lightyear an announced on Facebook that they would be reforming. The band stated that this time it's a 'proper reunion' not just for a one-off tour and there will be new material. They toured in October and started a crowdfunding campaign to make a documentary about the band and the UK scene it is part of.

Touring 
The band have been on tour with Capdown, Mad Caddies, Goldfinger, Slow Gherkin, 311, Mustard Plug, Big D and the Kids Table, Save Ferris, Nerf Herder, The Peacocks, Link 80 and Suicide Machines. They also played at 'Holidays in the Sun' for two years running (alongside The Business, The Exploited and more).

Influence 
Drowned in Sound listed them as one of the important bands that made up the UK underground's ska punk scene. The publication noted that Chris Gentlemens Hairdresser and Railway Book Shop transcended the scene to appeal to a wider audience.

Members 
 Ben Ashton – tenor saxophone, baritone saxophone, additional vocals
 Richard 'Bars' Barling – bass and backing vocals
 Neil 'Nelb' Cowie – guitar, additional vocals
 Neil Draycott – acoustic guitar, trumpet and vocals (also member of Cotton Weary)
 Jim Harrison – drums (has 2 kids with his wife Ky called Buster and Talia)
 Chas Palmer-Williams – vocals (also member of Cotton Weary)
 Kraig Winterbottom – trumpet, additional vocals
 Mark Wood – trumpet, additional vocals

Guest musicians 
 Dan Sanfey – vocals (member of Five Knuckle)
 Kassim Basma – vocals (member of Adequate Seven)
 Tom Pinder – trombone (member of Adequate Seven)
 Joey Malibu & Coke  – scratching
 Lewis Froy – vocals –  (member of Captain Everything!)
 Jon Whitehouse – vocals (member of Captain Everything!)

Discography 
As well as two albums Lightyear also released a split EP with friends Evil Macaroni, a 'demo', and contributed to several international punk compilation CDs.

Albums 
 Call of the Weasel Clan (Household Name Records, 2001) (vinyl re-release Banquet Records, 2012)
 Chris Gentlemens Hairdresser and Railway Book Shop (Household Name Records, 2003) (vinyl re-release Banquet Records, 2012)

EPs 
 Lightyear Vs. Evil Macaroni (Positive Outlook, 2000)

Singles 
 "Just Another Demonstration" (self-released, 2000)

Music videos 
 "A Pack of Dogs" (2001)

Other projects 
Draycott and Palmer-Williams played together in another band called Cotton Weary. In 2009, Palmer-Williams started a solo folk project under his own name, releasing an EP (We Showed Them, Didn't We) in 2010 and a full-length album (American Smile, British Teeth) in 2015.

References

External links 
 Lightyear profile on Household Name Records website

Third-wave ska groups
Underground punk scene in the United Kingdom
English ska musical groups
Musical groups from Derby
Ska punk musical groups